Hickson & Welch was a British chemicals company based in Castleford.

History
Ernest Hickson had founded a company in 1893 to introduce sulphur black (a sulphur dye) to the British cotton industry. In 1915 Hickson & Partners Ltd was founded.

Foundation
In 1931 Hickson & Welch Ltd was founded, from the site that had been destroyed in 1930.

From 1944 the company made DDT, becoming the UK's largest manufacturer.

Hickson and Welch (Holdings) Ltd was incorporated on 28 September 1951. It made dyestuffs, DDT (pesticide), and timber preservatives. It had the subsidiaries Hickson & Welch Ltd, and Hickson's Timber Impregnation Co. (G.B.) Ltd. The timber subsidiary had been founded on 25 October 1946. The timber preservative contained dinitrophenol, and was marketed as Triolith, Tanalith and Pyrolith. Pyrolith contained a flame-proofing agent.

Public company
It became a public company on 30 November 1951. The company became known as Hickson International from 1985.

In August 1991 it sold William Blythe of Lancashire for £23 million to Holliday of Huddersfield.

It bought Angus Fine Chemicals for £22.3 million in July 1992.

Closure
In August 2000 Hickson International plc was bought by Arch Chemicals. At the time Hickson employed over 1,300 people, had assets of £73 million, and a revenue of £208 million.

It was rebranded as C6 Solutions and closed in July 2005. The gas fired power station was demolished in 2021. To the east was Wheldale Colliery, and opposite the site is The Jungle rugby league ground; Castleford is synonymous with rugby league.

Explosions

1926 explosion
In November 1926 an explosion occurred while workers were packing an intermediate dye, thought to be non-explosive. Two men died.

1930 explosion
On 4 July 1930, just before noon, there was an explosion on the site's nitration plant. It destroyed the factory, killing 13 people and injuring 32 people. It made 300 houses in the town uninhabitable. Ernest Hickson later died (natural causes, 30 July 1930) and his earlier company was liquidated.
Inspector J.A.Gee of the Castleford West Riding Police, was subsequently appointed an OBE by HM George V, for his work following the explosion.

1992 explosion
On 21 September 1992, an explosion at the factory killed five workers, and injured around two hundred people. At 13.20 a distillation column still base containing residues of nitrotoluene ignited. The fireball went through the site's control room and killed two men instantly. The fireball then entered a four-storey office block; a woman and two men passed away from their injuries later. The explosion cost £3.5 million.It made schools in the area shut down.

Structure
The site was next to the River Aire in Castleford Ings, in the north of Castleford, accessed from the A6032/A656 roundabout. The site was 163 acres. Eight hundred people were employed on the Castleford site.

Power station
Powergen (now E.ON UK) installed a £30 million CHP gas turbine power station at the site. ENEL Power built the power station, which had a 44MW General Electric LM6000 engine. The generation equipment was built by Nuovo Pignone. It had a 13MW steam turbine, with the site producing around 56MW of electricity. 

The power station began operations in October 2002. The power station was demolished in 2021.

Products
 Wood protection
 Furniture coatings
 Organic chemicals

References

External links

 Official website of Hickson & Welch 
 E.ON power station

Video clips
 The site in June 2005
 Demolition of final structure in 2011
 1930 explosion

British companies established in 1931
Buildings and structures in the City of Wakefield
Castleford
Chemical companies of the United Kingdom
Chemical disasters
Chemical plants of the United Kingdom
Companies based in Wakefield
Companies formerly listed on the London Stock Exchange
Defunct companies based in Yorkshire
Defunct manufacturing companies of the United Kingdom
Disasters in Yorkshire
Explosions in 1926
Explosions in 1930
Explosions in 1992
Explosions in England
Industrial fires and explosions in the United Kingdom
Chemical companies established in 1931
Chemical companies disestablished in 2005
Pesticides in the United Kingdom
2005 disestablishments in the United Kingdom
1930 disasters in the United Kingdom
1992 disasters in the United Kingdom